Stop the World – I Want to Get Off is a 1961 musical with a book, music, and lyrics by Leslie Bricusse and Anthony Newley.

According to Oscar Levant, the play's title was derived from graffiti.

Plot
The show, set against a circus backdrop, focuses on Littlechap from the moment of his birth until his death. Each time something unsatisfactory happens, he calls out 'Stop the world!' and addresses the audience. After being born, going through school, and finding work as a tea-boy, his first major step towards improving his lot is to marry his boss' daughter Evie after getting her pregnant out of wedlock. Saddled with the responsibilities of a family, he is given a job in his father-in-law's factory. He has two daughters, Susan and Jane, but truly longs for a son. He allows his growing dissatisfaction with his existence to lead him into the arms of various women in his business travels—Russian official Anya, German domestic Ilse, and American cabaret singer Ginnie—as he searches for something better than he has.  He becomes rich and successful and is elected to public office. Only in his old age does he realize that what he always had, the love of his wife, was more than enough to sustain him. But Evie dies, and Littlechap comes to terms with his own selfishness while writing his memoirs. At the moment of his death, he watches his second daughter give birth to a son. When the boy nearly dies, Littlechap intervenes and allows Death to take him instead. He then mimes his own birth, beginning the cycle once again.

Production history
Opening first in Manchester, the original production transferred to the West End and opened on 20 July 1961 at the Queen's Theatre. Directed by Newley, it ran for 485 performances. Newley starred as Littlechap, with Anna Quayle playing the multiple roles of Evie and the other women in his life. Marti Webb made her West End debut as a member of the chorus. An original cast recording was released by Decca Records.

Producer David Merrick, always impressed by a low-cost project requiring minimal sets, costumes, and a small cast, decided to stage the show in New York City. It was directed by Newley, and featured scenery and lighting design by Sean Kenny, musical supervision by Ian Fraser, musical direction by Milton Rosenstock, orchestrations by Ian Fraser. After one preview, the Broadway production opened on 3 October 1962 at the Shubert Theatre, eventually transferring to the Ambassador to complete its 555-performance run. Newley and Quayle reprised their London roles. Newley later was replaced by Kenneth Nelson, then Joel Grey, and Joan Eastman assumed the roles of Evie et al.

A Broadway cast limited run recording was originally released by RCA Victor Records, however, the mainstream version was subsequently released by London Records. On the national company tour, the show starred Grey and Julie Newmar.

A Broadway revival directed by Mel Shapiro opened on 3 August 1978 at the New York State Theater in Lincoln Center, where it ran for 30 performances. The cast included Sammy Davis Jr. and Marian Mercer. A revival cast recording was released by Warner Bros. Records.

A London revival, directed by Newley, opened at the Lyric Theatre on 19 October 1989, starring Newley and Rhonda Burchmore. It was updated slightly, but it retained the Nazi-ish Fraulein, the Bolshevik Russian girl, and the Judy-Holliday-ditzy American blond—all much more distant than in 1961 and thus outside the experience of anyone under 40. It received poor reviews and closed after just 52 performances over five weeks. Newley was very disappointed and bitter about the reviews, as he told the audience after the final curtain.

Film adaptation
A 1966 Warner Bros. release was little more than a filmed version of a staged production. Directed by Philip Saville, it featured additional material by Alan and Marilyn Bergman, David Donable, and Al Ham. The cast included Tony Tanner and Millicent Martin. Neither a critical nor commercial success, it was nominated for an Academy Award for Best Adapted Music Scoring. The film deleted the German mistress sequence and substituted a Japanese mistress. It is not clear whether this was the Bergman contribution or if Newley and Bricusse created the new sequence. It is also unclear why this substitution was made. In the film version, the show ends with "What Kind of Fool Am I?" There is no birth of a grandson, nor of Littlechap choosing to die in his place and being reborn, as in the original musical play. With the exception of "Typische Deutsche," the original score is transferred complete.

Sammy Davis Jr. and Marian Mercer reprised their Broadway revival roles for Sammy Stops the World, a 1978 television adaptation

In 1996, a TV movie version was produced starring Peter Scolari as Littlechap and Stephanie Zimbalist as Evie. Made for the A&E Network, it adhered closely to the format of the original stage production.

Songs

 Act I
 The A.B.C. Song
 I Want to Be Rich
 Typically English
 A Special Announcement
 Lumbered
 Welcome to Sludgepool
 Gonna Build a Mountain
 Glorious Russian
 Meilinki Meilchick
 Family Fugue
 Typische Deutsche
 Nag! Nag! Nag!

 Act II
 All-American
 Once in a Lifetime
 Mumbo Jumbo
 Welcome to Sunvale
 Life Is A Woman
 Someone Nice Like You
 What Kind of Fool Am I?

Cast

London replacements 
Littlechap: Tony Tanner

Evie, Anya, Isle, Ginnie: Millicent Martin

Broadway replacements
Littlechap: Joel Grey, Kenneth Nelson

Notable national tour replacements
Littlechap: Kenneth Nelson

Awards and nominations

Original Broadway production

References

External links
 
 

1961 musicals
West End musicals
Broadway musicals
1966 films
1966 musical films
Warner Bros. films
Compositions by Leslie Bricusse
Original musicals
Films shot at Pinewood Studios
Films based on musicals
British musicals
Tony Award-winning musicals